Galerina graminea, known as the turf bell is a species of mushroom in the genus Galerina. Unlike many Galerina mushrooms, it can survive in moss-free grass. It was known for many years as 'Galerina laevis', proposed by Christiaan Hendrik Persoon. Galerina means helmet-like, while graminea means "of grass". It isn't known whether it is poisonous or not, however it is suspected to be.

References

Fungi described in 1921
Hymenogastraceae